Bruno Alexandre Vaza Ferreira, known as Bruno (born 12 October 1970) is a former Portuguese football player, most notably with Braga.

Club career
He made his professional debut in the Primeira Liga for Torreense on 18 August 1991 as a starter and scored his team's only goal in a 1–1 draw against Paços de Ferreira. Over his career, he played 172 games on the top level of Portuguese club football.

References

1970 births
People from Torres Vedras
Living people
Portuguese footballers
S.C.U. Torreense players
Primeira Liga players
S.C. Braga players
Association football midfielders
Sportspeople from Lisbon District